Hans-Joachim Wagner (born January 31, 1955) is a retired German football player. He spent 7 seasons in the Bundesliga with Borussia Dortmund. The best league finish he achieved was 6th place.

External links
 

1955 births
Living people
German footballers
Borussia Dortmund players
Rot-Weiss Essen players
Bundesliga players
2. Bundesliga players
Association football defenders